WZYQ is an urban adult contemporary formatted broadcast radio station.  The station is licensed to Mound Bayou, Mississippi and serves Cleveland and Shelby in Mississippi. WZYQ is licensed to Fenty L. Fuss and operated by Delta Radio Network.

History
WZYQ signed on at 101.9 MHz, on a separate license, on October 10, 1997.

In June 2006, the station's owner, Jerry D. Russell, suffered a stroke. The station was being operated by another broadcaster, Hodges Broadcasting LLC, under a local marketing agreement but that operator was unable to obtain the financing to purchase the station. With Hodges gone and Russell unable to operate the station himself, WZYQ went off the air for good in early 2007. In a February 2011 letter to the FCC, the owner indicated that he was surrendering the station's broadcast license as well as the licenses for ten sister stations in similar dire circumstances. On May 2, 2011, the station's license was cancelled and the WZYQ call sign assignment was deleted permanently from the FCC database.

In 2015, Fuss won at auction a new construction permit for the Mound Bayou allocation—now moved to 101.7 MHz. The new station took the same call letters as the old one and went on air in July, initially simulcasting WIQQ (102.1 FM).

References

External links
 Star 101 Online
 

1997 establishments in Mississippi
Urban adult contemporary radio stations in the United States
ZYQ
ZYQ
Mound Bayou, Mississippi